Wunderkind (German pronunciation: [ˈvʊndɐkɪnt]) is a German fashion brand. It was established by Wolfgang Joop and his partner Edwin Lemberg in Potsdam in 2003.

The company headquarters are the Villa Rumpf in Potsdam.

History
The label was started in Potsdam by Wolfgang Joop and Edwin Lemberg in 2003. Joop's first international Wunderkind show was at the New York Fashion Week in September 2004. The show was presented in New York City for three consecutive seasons before it switched location to Paris in 2006. A collection was presented during Paris Fashion Week each season until the spring 2011 season before a dispute with investors forced the brand to take a hiatus. Joop came back with a collection in the spring of 2012 which he presented in his hometown of Potsdam and received positive reception. The show celebrated a comeback during Paris Fashion Week for the spring 2013 season but on a smaller scale than before. In fall 2017, Joop retired from the brand and Hugo Boss alum Peter Kappler was assigned the new CEO of the brand.

Stores
In 2013 Wunderkind opened a store in Munich, and announced that it would open others in Paris, Potsdam and on the island of Sylt. The brand can also be found online on websites such as Farfetch, Shopstyle and Avenue 32.

References

Clothing brands of Germany
High fashion brands
Clothing companies established in 2003
Companies based in Potsdam
Luxury brands